Wesleyan Christian Academy is a private Christian school located in High Point, North Carolina, across from the former Oak Hollow Mall complex. Wesleyan Christian Academy is accredited by AdvancED and the Association of Christian Schools International.

History 
In 1971, Wesleyan was founded by Clyde A. Parker of the First Wesleyan Church of High Point. During the summer of 1981, Kernersville Wesleyan Academy would merge with the Wesleyan Education Center and was created into what is now Wesleyan Christian Academy. Wesleyan had its first graduating class in 1982.

Athletics
The Wesleyan Christian Academy Trojans play in numerous varsity sports. The school competes in the 4A division of the North Carolina Independent Schools Athletic Association (NCISAA). The Trojans' primary rival is Greensboro Day School, an independent school located in nearby  Greensboro, NC . Wesleyan's secondary rival is High Point Christian Academy, an independent school also located in High Point. Wesleyan's athletic director is Glen Foster.

Wesleyan won the 1991–92 Wachovia Cup for Class 1A, awarded annually to high schools with the best interscholastic sports programs based on overall performance across sports programs throughout the year.

The men's soccer team won consecutive NCISAA titles in the 1990s, winning the NCISAA Class 1A state title in 1988, 1990, 1991 (2–1 vs. Fayetteville Academy) and 1992 (1–0 vs O'Neal School). The team returned to success with another state championship in 2005, followed by state titles in (2011, 2012, 2014, 2015, 2017, 2018).

The boys basketball team has won the NCISAA championship six times: in 1985, 1986, 1989, 1993, 2013, and 2014. In 2018, it was announced former coach Keith Gatlin would join High Point University's basketball team as an assistant coach under Tubby Smith. Notable players to come out of the Wesleyan program include, Theo Pinson, Harry Giles, and Jaylen Hoard.

The Trojans added lacrosse as an official sport for the 2008 spring season. The Trojans had a club team in 2007, and is currently led under coach Joe Young.  In 2010, Colin Kennedy became the new head coach; he attends High Point University as a junior.

In 2008, the men's baseball team rolled to the NCISAA state championship with a 23–2 record.  In 2010, the baseball team again won the NCISAA 3A State championship by beating Forsyth Country Day in the best-of-three finals in a two-game sweep. In 2018, Wesleyan defeated Charlotte Christian in the NCISAA 3A Finals, claiming their 5th NCISAA 3A State championship. The baseball team has won 5 NCISAA 3A State championship's (2008, 2010, 2016, 2017, 2018).

Wesleyan was the 2010 NCISAA state champion in both Girls Swimming and Men's Wrestling.

Fine arts
Wesleyan has one of the finest Fine Arts departments in NC.  It won the Harris Teeter jingle award in 2009 and 2010.  In 2008, a private Teaching Studio, under the direction of Michael Jarrett, was established to provide private instruction in instrumental and vocal music.  The Studio now employs twenty-two part-time professional teachers and provides two hundred private lessons per week (school and community). The Studio is one of the largest in the Triad. Wesleyan now has 4th– 8th-grade choruses and three high school choruses. Each of the choruses goes to one or more accreditations. The Wesleyan Fine Arts has band programs for 6th– 8th-grade students and a high school band. There is also a Praise Band. Wesleyan Christian Academy hosts a High School musical annually. There is also an elementary musical, in which the fourth graders have the leading roles.

Future growth
In 2010 Wesleyan bought  of land in Colfax.  It is located at the corner of Johnson St and Sandy Ridge Rd.  The school plans to develop the land over the next few years, moving the school to the new land. They will do it in stage including sports fields, grounds, classes, and student life.

PPP funds
Wesleyan Education Center received $1,811,734 in PPP funds during the 2020 COVID-19 pandemic.

Notable alumni
 Patrick Bailey, catcher in the San Francisco Giants organization
 Montay Brandon, professional basketball player
 Brandt Bronico, Major League Soccer player
 Elizabeth Carty, competitor in the Miss Teen USA pageant
 Brandon Childress, professional basketball player
 Drew Fulk, music producer and songwriter
 Harry Giles, NBA player for the Sacramento Kings
Jaylen Hoard (born 1999), French-American basketball player for Hapoel Tel Aviv of the Israeli Basketball Premier League
 Wil Myers, MLB player for the San Diego Padres, 2016 All-Star selection
 Theo Pinson, NBA player for the New York Knicks
 Aaron Wiggins, basketball player

References

External links
School Website

Christian schools in North Carolina
Private high schools in North Carolina
Educational institutions established in 1971
Schools in Guilford County, North Carolina
Private middle schools in North Carolina
Private elementary schools in North Carolina
Preparatory schools in North Carolina
1971 establishments in North Carolina